Plutella geniatella is a moth of the  family Plutellidae. It is found in France, Germany, Austria, Switzerland, Italy and Romania.

References

Moths described in 1839
Plutellidae
Moths of Europe